No. 695 Squadron RAF was an anti-aircraft co-operation squadron of the Royal Air Force from 1943 to 1949.

History
The squadron was formed at RAF Bircham Newton, Norfolk, on 1 December 1943, from 1611, 1612 and 1626 (Anti-aircraft co-operation) Flights for anti-aircraft co-operation duties, and operated a variety of aircraft in this role. On 11 August 1945 the squadron moved to RAF Horsham St. Faith, while a detachment served from 27 July 1946 at first from RAF Boxted in Essex and later, between November 1946 and April 1947, from RAF North Weald. The squadron was disbanded on 11 February 1949, when it was renumbered to No. 34 Squadron RAF. That unit took over the aircraft, as well as the squadron codes, 4M and 8Q.

Aircraft operated

Squadron bases

See also
List of Royal Air Force aircraft squadrons

References

Notes

Bibliography

External links
 History of No. 695 Squadron
 History of No.'s 671–1435 Squadrons at RAF Web

No. 695
No. 695 Squadron
Military units and formations established in 1943
Military units and formations disestablished in 1949